This is a list of the Australian moth species of the family Hyblaeidae. It also acts as an index to the species articles and forms part of the full List of moths of Australia.

Hyblaea constellata Guenée, 1852
Hyblaea ibidias Turner, 1902
Hyblaea puera (Cramer, 1777)
Hyblaea synaema Turner, 1902

External links 
Hyblaeidae at Australian Faunal Directory

Australia
Hyblaeidae